Rajinder Singh Hans (born 10 March 1953) is a former Indian first-class cricketer and coach. He was a slow left-arm orthodox bowler and played for Uttar Pradesh between 1976–77 and 1986–87, taking 340 first-class wickets. 

Hans moved from his birthplace in Bombay to work for Mohan Meakin in Ghaziabad in Uttar Pradesh. In the Ranji Trophy final at Narendra Mohan Sports Stadium against Karnataka in 1977–78, he took 9 for 152, which remain the best figures for Ranji Trophy finals; nevertheless, Uttar Pradesh lost by an innings. He played for Central Zone against touring teams and in the Duleep Trophy from 1976–77 to 1984–85. He was part of the Indian Test squad against the touring Australian team during the 1979–80 series in India, but Dilip Doshi was preferred for the Test team.

Hans was the coach of Uttar Pradesh from 2001–02 to 2006–07. Under his coaching, Uttar Pradesh won the Ranji Trophy in 2005–06 for the first time. He coached Jharkhand in the Ranji Trophy team in 2007–08. He was a member of the All India Junior Selection Committee for two years, 2008–09 and 2009–10. In September 2012 he was appointed as the national selector from the Central Zone.

References

External links
 
 Rajinder Hans at CricketArchive

1953 births
Living people
Uttar Pradesh cricketers
Indian cricketers
Central Zone cricketers
Indian cricket coaches
Cricketers from Mumbai